Djenaba Faith Allison Joseph (born 28 February 2004) is an Trinidadian cricketer who plays for Trinidad and Tobago and the West Indies. She plays as a right-handed batter and right-arm medium bowler.

Domestic career
During the 2022 season, Joseph starred on multiple occasions for the Trinidad and Tobago Under-19s team, for example with an all-round performance to help beat Windward Islands Under-19s in April and 56* to help heat Barbados Under-19s in July.

Joseph made her debut for the senior Trinidad and Tobago side on 9 June 2022, in the Twenty20 Blaze, although the match was abandoned with a toss. She went on to play five matches overall for Trinidad and Tobago that season, with a top score of 23 in her side's victory over Leeward Islands.

International career
Joseph played for the West Indies Under-19s team throughout 2022, and was subsequently selected for the 2023 ICC Under-19 Women's T20 World Cup. She was ever-present for the side at the tournament, scoring 76 runs in her four innings.

On 11 December 2022, it was announced that Joseph had been named in the West Indies squad for their T20I series against England. She made her Twenty20 International debut later that day, against England at Sir Vivian Richards Stadium, where she made 8 runs. She played four matches overall in the series, scoring 23 runs at an average of 5.75.

References

External links
 
 

Living people
2004 births
West Indian women cricketers
West Indies women Twenty20 International cricketers
Trinidad and Tobago women cricketers